Rojas Magallanes is an elevated metro station on the Line 4 of the Santiago Metro, in Santiago, Chile. The station has two side platforms and two tracks on a precast concrete segmental viaduct with single central columns. It is enclosed in a tubular structure with elliptical cross section, from which protrude two balcony-like structures containing stairs that lead to the mezzanine level.

The station was opened on 30 November 2005 as part of the inaugural section of the line between Vicente Valdés and Plaza de Puente Alto.

References

Santiago Metro stations
Santiago Metro Line 4